The Bank of America Center is an 18-story highrise building in Baltimore, Maryland at 100 South Charles Street.

References
 
 

Bank of America buildings
Skyscraper office buildings in Baltimore
Office buildings completed in 1965
Downtown Baltimore
Inner Harbor, Baltimore